Djenné Cercle  is an administrative subdivision of the Mopti Region of Mali. The administrative center (chef-lieu) is the town of Djenné. In the 2009 census the cercle had a population of 207,260 people.

Administrative subdivisions
The Djenné Cercle is divided into 12 communes:

Dandougou Fakala
Derary
Djenné
Fakala
Femaye
Kéwa
Madiama
Néma Badenyakafo
Niansanarié
Ouro Ali
Pondori
Togué Mourari

References

Cercles of Mali
Mopti Region